Lac de Ganivet is a lake in Lozère, France. Its surface area is 0.12 km².

Ganivet